The 1983 Baltimore Orioles won the Major League Baseball World Series after finishing first in the American League East with a record of 98 wins and 64 losses, The Orioles won the championship by beating the Philadelphia Philles, 4–1, in the 1983 World Series. The season was the Orioles' first in nearly 15 years without manager Earl Weaver, who retired after the Orioles missed the playoffs in the final game of the 1982 season. The Orioles replaced the future Hall of Famer Weaver with Joe Altobelli. The World Series victory was the Orioles' first championship since 1970 and their most recent to date.

After many years the Orioles made the jump to cable television, with a separate broadcast team on their then first cable broadcaster, Super TV. They would move to Home Team Sports the following year.

Offseason 
 October 19, 1982: RHP, Don Stanhouse was released by the Orioles.
 November 13, 1982 Named Manager, Joe Altobelli
 November 29, 1982 signed, LHP, Dan Morogiello as a free agent.
 January 15, 1983: Catcher, Joe Nolan was re-signed as a free agent with the Baltimore Orioles.
 February 3, 1983: Third Baseman, Aurelio Rodriguez was signed as a free agent with the Baltimore Orioles.
 February 23, 1983: Outfielder, John Lowenstein was re-signed as a free agent with the Baltimore Orioles.
 April 4, 1983 Pinch Hitter/Outfielder Terry Crowley was released by the Orioles

Regular season

Season standings

Record vs. opponents

Opening Day starters 
Rich Dauer
Rick Dempsey
Dan Ford
Leo Hernández
Dennis Martínez
Eddie Murray
Cal Ripken Jr.
Gary Roenicke
John Shelby
Ken Singleton

Notable transactions 
June 13, 1983: Traded catcher/third baseman Floyd Rayford (playing for the Rochester Red Wings at the time of the trade) to the St. Louis Cardinals for a player to be named later
 June 30, 1983: Todd Cruz was purchased by the Orioles from the Seattle Mariners.
 August 13, 1983: Aurelio Rodriguez was released by the Baltimore Orioles.
 August 31, 1983: Acquired outfielder Tito Landrum from the St. Louis Cardinals completing the Floyd Rayford trade.

Roster

An Overview of the Team
On April 3, 1983 the Baltimore Orioles left spring training with much the same team that fell just a game short of the playoffs the year before. Of the Orioles starting in the 1982 Opening Day lineup only Lenn Sakata and Al Bumbry would lose their opening day spots in 1983. Terry Crowley was the last player cut during spring training, and on his way out of the clubhouse he predicted an Orioles championship, "The shame of it is," he told a ''Sun reporter, "the Orioles are going to win in it all this year, and Joe is going to do a tremendous job" Still, the team was an up-and-coming squad, in fact, no Oriole would be voted on to the All Star team's starting lineup. However, the team featured three future Hall of Famers:
Cal Ripken who had won Rookie of the Year honors the year before completed his transition from third base to shortstop playing his first full season at his new position
Perennial All-Star Eddie Murray won a Silver Slugger Award and Gold Glove Award at first base
The aging Jim Palmer started only 11 games but would come out of the bullpen for his final career victory in the World Series 
During an August 24, 1983 game, Orioles pitcher Tippy Martinez picked off three Toronto Blue Jays baserunners in one inning. The baserunners were Barry Bonnell, Dave Collins and Willie Upshaw.

While the Orioles fielded a team similar to the team fielded in 1982 Altobelli put his own mark on the squad by breaking camp with a four-man rotation which occasionally increased to five pitchers rather than the three man rotation preferred by Weaver.

Starting pitching
One significant difference between the 1982 Baltimore Orioles and the 1983 Baltimore Orioles was Altobelli's willingness to use different starting pitchers. Ten different, Orioles pitches would take the mound to start a game in 1983 whereas in 1982 only six players got the starting nod.

Game log

Regular season 

|-style=background:#fbb
||1|| April 4 || Royals || 2–7 || Gura (1–0) || Martínez (0–1) || — || 51,889 || 0–1 || L1
|-style=background:#bfb
||2|| April 6 || Royals || 11–1 || Flanagan (1–0) || Leonard (0–1) || — || 7,904 || 1–1 || W1
|-style=background:#bbb
||--|| April 7 || Royals || colspan=8|Postponed (rain); Makeup: August 19 
|-style=background:#fbb
||3|| April 9 || @ Indians || 4–8 || Sutcliffe (2–0) || Stewart (0–1) || Spillner (2) || 52,150 || 1–2 || L1
|-style=background:#bfb
||4|| April 10 || @ Indians || 13–2 || Martínez (1–1) || Sorensen (0–1) || — || 10,721 || 2–2 || W1
|-style=background:#bfb
||5|| April 12 || @ White Sox || 10–8 || Stewart (1–1) || Lamp (1–1) || — || 38,306 || 3–2 || W2
|-style=background:#fbb
||6|| April 14 || @ White Sox || 11–12 || Barojas (1–0) || Welchel (0–1) || Hickey (2) || 13,622 || 3–3 || L1
|-style=background:#bbb
||--|| April 15 || Indians || colspan=8|Postponed (rain); Makeup: April 16 
|-style=background:#bfb
||7|| April 16 || Indians || 2–0 || Palmer (1–0) || Sorensen (0–2) || Martinez (1) || N/A || 4–3 || W1
|-style=background:#fbb
||8|| April 16 || Indians || 4–7 || Heaton (1–0) || Martínez (1–2) || Spillner (4) || 10,016 || 4–4 || L1
|-style=background:#bfb
||9|| April 17 || Indians || 6–1 || Flanagan (2–0) || Blyleven (0–3) || — || 36,430 || 5–4 || W1
|-style=background:#bfb
||10|| April 18 || Indians || 4–1 || McGregor (1–0) || Barker (2–1) || — || 9,610 || 6–4 || W2
|-

|-style=background:#bbb
||--|| May 16 || White Sox || colspan=8|Postponed (rain); Makeup: May 17 
|-style=background:#bfb
||33|| May 17 || White Sox || 7–2 || Stoddard (2–0) || Hoyt (2–6) || — || N/A || 20–13 || W1
|-style=background:#bfb
||34|| May 17 || White Sox || 5–0 || Boddicker (1–0) || Lamp (3–3) || — || 14,314 || 21–13 || W2
|-style=background:#bfb
||35|| May 18 || White Sox || 1–0 || Martinez (2–1) || Dotson (4–4) || — || 12,582 || 22–13 || W3
|-style=background:#fbb
||43|| May 26 || @ Royals || 2–8 || Renko (4–3) || Boddicker (1–2) || — || 26,131 || 23–20 || L7
|-style=background:#bfb
||44|| May 27 || @ Royals || 7–4 || Davis (3–1) || Gura (4–6) || Martinez (5) || 23,675 || 24–20 || W1
|-style=background:#bfb
||45|| May 28 || @ Royals || 1–0 || McGregor (5–3) || Armstrong (2–2) || — || 29,616 || 25–20 || W2
|-style=background:#fbb
||46|| May 29 || @ Royals || 0–4 || Splittorff (2–1)  || Martínez (3–9) || Quisenberry (11) || 29,035 || 25–21 || L1
|-

|-style=background:#bbb
||--|| June 14 || @ Brewers || colspan=8|Postponed (rain); Makeup: June 16 
|-style=background:#bbb
||--|| June 20 || Yankees || colspan=8|Postponed (rain); Makeup: September 30 
|-style=background:#bbb
||--|| June 28 || @ Yankees || colspan=8|Postponed (rain); Makeup: September 10 
|-

|-style=background:#bbb
||--|| July 4 || @ Tigers || colspan=8|Postponed (rain); Makeup: September 21 
|-style=background:#bbbfff
||--|| July 6 || colspan="9"|54th All-Star Game in Chicago, IL
|-

|-style=background:#fbb
||100|| August 2 || @ Indians || 1–3 || Blyleven (7–9) || Martínez (6–13) || Anderson (3) || N/A || 59–41 || L1
|-style=background:#fbb
||101|| August 2 || @ Indians || 3–4 || Brennan (1–1) || Ramirez (4–2) || Anderson (4) || 17,286 || 59–42 || L2
|-style=background:#bfb
||102|| August 3 || @ Indians || 8–2 || Davis (10–4) || Sutcliffe (12–7) || — || 8,549 || 60–42 || W1
|-style=background:#bfb
||103|| August 4 || @ Indians || 4–3 (10) || McGregor (14–4) || Anderson (0–3) || Martinez (11) || 6,368 || 61–42 || W2
|-style=background:#bfb
||104|| August 5 || White Sox || 5–4 || Boddicker (8–5) || Lamp (5–7) || — || 39,544 || 62–42 || W3
|-style=background:#fbb
||105|| August 6 || White Sox || 4–6 || Bannister (9–9) || Martínez (6–14) || Barojas (10) || 32,769 || 62–43 || L1
|-style=background:#fbb
||106|| August 7 || White Sox || 3–4 || Hoyt (14–10) || Flanagan (6–1) || Lamp (8) || 24,384 || 62–44 || L2
|-style=background:#fbb
||107|| August 8 || Indians || 4–9 || Sutcliffe (13–7) || Davis (10–5) || — || 24,324 || 62–45 || L3
|-style=background:#fbb
||108|| August 9 || Indians || 3–4 || Heaton (6–4) || McGregor (14–5) || — || 24,324 || 62–46 || L4
|-style=background:#fbb
||109|| August 10 || Indians || 3–4 || Sorensen (6–9) || Boddicker (8–6) || — || 18,294 || 62–47 || L5
|-style=background:#fbb
||110|| August 11 || @ White Sox || 3–9 || Bannister (10–9) || Ramirez (4–3) || — || 31,810 || 62–48 || L6
|-style=background:#fbb
||111|| August 12 || @ White Sox || 1–2 || Hoyt (15–10) || Flanagan (6–2) || — || 45,588 || 62–49 || L7
|-style=background:#bfb
||112|| August 13 || @ White Sox || 5–2 || Stewart (5–3) || Koosman (8–5) || Martinez (12) || 36,232 || 63–49 || W1
|-style=background:#bfb
||113|| August 14 || @ White Sox || 2–1 || McGregor (15–5) || Dotson (12–7) || Stoddard (5) || 37,846 || 64–49 || W2
|-style=background:#bfb
||117|| August 19 || Royals || 5–4 || Stewart (6–3) || Quisenberry (5–2) || — || N/A || 67–50 || W2
|-style=background:#bfb
||118|| August 19 || Royals || 3–1 || Martinez (6–3) || Rasmussen (1–2) || — || 35,582 || 68–50 || W3
|-style=background:#bfb
||119|| August 20 || Royals || 6–1 || Boddicker (10–6) || Gura (10–15) || Martinez (13) || 23,069 || 69–50 || W4
|-style=background:#fbb
||120|| August 21 || Royals || 3–8 || Black (7–4) || Palmer (2–3) || Quisenberry (34) || 29,044 || 69–51 || L1
|-style=background:#bfb
||127|| August 29 || @ Royals || 9–2 || McGregor (16–5) || Perry (6–13) || — || 20,367 || 75–52 || W6
|-style=background:#bfb
||128|| August 30 || @ Royals || 12–4 || Davis (11–5) || Rasmussen (2–3) || — || 15,769 || 76–52 || W7
|-

|-style=background:#bbb
||--|| September 12 || @ Red Sox || colspan=8|Postponed (rain); Makeup: September 13 
|-

|- style="text-align:center;"
| Legend:       = Win       = Loss       = PostponementBold = Orioles team member

Postseason 

|- bgcolor=#ffcccc
| 1 || October 5 || White Sox || 1–2 || Hoyt (1–0) || McGregor (0–1) || — || Memorial Stadium || 51,289 || 0–1
|- bgcolor=#ccffcc
| 2 || October 6 || White Sox || 4–0 || Boddicker (1–0) || Bannister (0–1) || — || Memorial Stadium || 52,347 || 1–1
|- bgcolor=#ccffcc
| 3 || October 7 || @ White Sox || 11–1 || Flanagan (1–0) || Dotson (0–1) || Stewart (1) || Comiskey Park || 46,635 || 2–1
|- bgcolor=#ccffcc
| 4 || October 8 || @ White Sox || 3–0 (10) || Martinez (1–0) || Burns (0–1) || — || Comiskey Park || 45,577 || 3–1

|- bgcolor=#ffcccc
| 1 || October 11 || Phillies || 1–2 || Denny (1–0) || McGregor (0–1) || Holland (1) || Memorial Stadium || 52,204 || 0–1
|- bgcolor=#ccffcc
| 2 || October 12 || Phillies || 4–1 || Boddicker (1–0) || Hudson (0–1) || — || Memorial Stadium || 52,132 || 1–1
|- bgcolor=#ccffcc
| 3 || October 14 || @ Phillies || 3–2 || Palmer (1–0) || Carlton (0–1) || Martinez (1) || Veterans Stadium || 65,792 || 2–1
|- bgcolor=#ccffcc
| 4 || October 15 || @ Phillies || 5–4 || Davis (1–0) || Denny (1–1) || Martinez (2) || Veterans Stadium || 66,947 || 3–1
|- bgcolor=#ccffcc
| 5 || October 16 || @ Phillies || 5–0 || McGregor (1–1) || Hudson (0–2) || — || Veterans Stadium || 67,064 || 4–1

Player stats

Batting

Starters by position 
Note: Pos = Position; G = Games played; AB = At bats; R = Runs; H = Hits; Avg. = Batting average; HR = Home runs; RBI = Runs batted in;  SB= Stolen bases

Other batters 
Note: G = Games played; AB = At bats; R = Runs; H = Hits; Avg. = Batting average; HR = Home runs; RBI = Runs batted in; SB= Stolen bases

Pitching

Starting pitchers 
Note: G = Games pitched; IP = Innings pitched; W = Wins; L = Losses; ERA = Earned run average; BB = Walks allowed; SO = Strikeouts

Other pitchers 
Note: G = Games pitched; IP = Innings pitched; W = Wins; L = Losses; ERA = Earned run average; BB = Walks allowed; SO = Strikeouts

Relief pitchers 
Note: G = Games pitched; IP = Innings pitched; W = Wins; L = Losses; SV = Saves; ERA = Earned run average; BB = Walks allowed; SO = Strikeouts

Postseason

ALCS

Summary

World Series

Awards and honors 
 Mike Boddicker, ALCS Most Valuable Player
 Rick Dempsey, Babe Ruth Award
 Rick Dempsey – World Series Most Valuable Player
 Eddie Murray, Silver Slugger Award
 Cal Ripken Jr., American League Most Valuable Player

All-Star Game

League leaders 
 Cal Ripken Jr. – American League Leader in At-Bats (663)
 Cal Ripken Jr. – American League Leader in Hits (211)
 Cal Ripken Jr. – American League Leader Runs Scored (121)
 Cal Ripken Jr. – American League Leader Doubles (47)

Farm system

Notes

References 

1983 Baltimore Orioles team at Baseball-Reference
1983 Baltimore Orioles season at baseball-almanac.com

External links
Baltimore Orioles 1983 Schedule at MLB.com

Baltimore Orioles seasons
Baltimore Orioles season
American League East champion seasons
American League champion seasons
World Series champion seasons
Baltimore Orioles